Lough Cullaun is a freshwater lake in the Mid-West Region of Ireland. It is located in The Burren of County Clare.

Geography and hydrology
The lake flows out to neighbouring Lough Atedaun.

Natural history
Fish species in Lough Cullaun include brown trout, perch, rudd, pike and the critically endangered European eel. The lake is part of the East Burren Complex Special Area of Conservation. It is also part of the Corofin Wetlands Special Protection Area.

See also
List of loughs in Ireland

References

Cullaun